Charles Rufus Baxter (November 4, 1929 – March 10, 2005) was an American doctor. Baxter was one of the doctors who unsuccessfully tried to save U.S. President John F. Kennedy after he was shot in Dallas, Texas, in 1963. He is also remembered for the Parkland formula, which gives an indication of how much fluid should be given to a patient with burns.

Biography
Born in Paris, Texas, Baxter graduated from the University of Texas at Austin in 1950. He then attended the University of Texas Southwestern Medical Center at Dallas where he received his medical degree in 1954.

Baxter was the emergency room director at Parkland Memorial Hospital when Kennedy was shot, and famously said of the event in 1988:

He also operated on Texas Governor John Connally, who had been wounded in the attack.

Baxter made advances in the treatment of burn victims, and founded the burn unit and a skin-graft bank at Parkland. The Parkland formula for fluids is attributed to him.

He died in Dallas, Texas, on March 10, 2005, of pneumonia, aged 75.

See also
Parkland formula

References

External links

1929 births
2005 deaths
American emergency physicians
Deaths from pneumonia in Texas
People associated with the assassination of John F. Kennedy
People from Paris, Texas
Physicians from Texas
University of Texas at Austin alumni
University of Texas Southwestern Medical Center alumni